Rahasyarathri is a 1974 Indian Malayalam film, directed by A. B. Raj and produced by R. S. Sreenivasan. The film stars Prem Nazir, Jayabharathi, Adoor Bhasi and Jose Prakash in the lead roles. The film had musical score by M. K. Arjunan.

Cast

Prem Nazir as Venu
Jayabharathi as Syamala
Adoor Bhasi as Padmaraj
Jose Prakash as Kurupu
Prema as Theatre artist
Sankaradi as Sankara Pilla
Sreelatha Namboothiri as Savithri 
Bahadoor as Chandrappan
Jameela Malik as Girija
Jayakumari as Cabaret dancer 
Kaduvakulam Antony as Unnithan
Kunchan as Kuttappan
Pala Thankam as Devaki
Paravoor Bharathan as RR Das
Philomina as Gouri, Venu's mother
Lakshmi as Girija's mother

Soundtrack
The music was composed by M. K. Arjunan and the lyrics were written by Vayalar Ramavarma.

References

External links
 

1974 films
1970s Malayalam-language films
Films directed by A. B. Raj